M. R. Singh (born 31 July 1954) is a former India cricket umpire. He stood in six ODI games between 1993 and 2000.

See also
 List of One Day International cricket umpires

References

1954 births
Living people
Indian One Day International cricket umpires
Place of birth missing (living people)